Stop Porn Culture is an international feminist anti-porn organization with branches in the United States, Norway, and the United Kingdom. It works as an advisory body, trains trainers, and builds public health educational materials based on empirical research. It has a network of volunteers and activists and collaborates with other organizations in the U.S. and Europe. Some of its work is grassroots activist work.

History
In the late 1990s and early 2000s, concurrent with the rapid growth of the Internet and the increased accessibility to pornography that it provided, feminists in the U.S. began to organize to discuss the proliferation of pornography and of "violence associated with its production and consumption". Some of the discussion participants decided to rebuild a national movement, similar to one of the previous 20 years, to address the harms of the pornography industry. Several feminists developed a contemporary version of the slide shows developed in the 1970s to be used as an educational tool and to inspire action against the pornification (or sexualization) of culture. Stop Porn Culture was created from these efforts.

Mission
The Stop Porn Culture mission statement reads:
Stop Porn Culture is dedicated to challenging the pornography industry and an increasingly pornographic pop culture. Our work toward ending industries of sexual exploitation is grounded in a feminist analysis of sexist, racist, and economic oppression. We affirm sexuality that is rooted in equality and free of exploitation, coercion, and violence.

Activism 

Gail Dines, founding member of Stop Porn Culture, wrote Pornland. In 2014 a documentary, with the same name, was released and promoted on the Stop Porn Culture website, and is described as "an ideal introduction to the core arguments of the feminist anti-pornography movement."

Stop Porn Culture works to create awareness on what it calls the current "porn culture." Much of this work is done online through online lecture videos and social media work as well as through workshops and conferences for Feminist Slideshow Training. It is an unpaid organization and recruits through a volunteer and internship program focused on marketing, digital writing, video editing, and social media projects.

In 2013 Stop Porn Culture started a petition against the journal Porn Studies, a first-of-its-kind, peer-reviewed publication focused on porn studies. Stop Porn Culture's co founder Gail Dines claimed that the journal has a pro-porn bias, a claim that the journal denied.

See also 
 Anti-pornography movement in the United States
 Anti-pornography movement in the United Kingdom
 Free Speech Coalition
 Morality in Media
 XXXchurch.com

Bibliography

References

External links 
 

Feminism and history
Anti-pornography feminism